This is a list of regional and minority parties in Europe.

Most of them are regionalist, some are autonomist or separatist, others represent minority interests. To be included in the list, parties need to gain at least 3.0% at the country-level or 3.0% in regional entities with at least 500,000 inhabitants or 6.0% in those with at least 100,000 inhabitants.

Notes
† = Observer or associate member.

Sources
European Election Database
Election Resources on the Internet
Psephos – Adam Carr's Election Archive
Parties and elections in Europe, by Wolfram Nordsieck
Belgium: Department of Elections – Ministry of the Interior
Croatia: State Electoral Commission
France: Elections – Ministry of the Interior
Germany: Elections in Germany, Election.de
Italy: Historical Archive of Elections – Ministry of the Interior
Netherlands: Election Results Database
Romania: 2020 Local Elections – Central Electoral Bureau
Spain: Elections – Ministry of the Interior
Ukraine: 2020 Zakarpattia Oblast election – Central Electoral Commission

Politics of Europe
Regionalist parties
Political parties of minorities
Stateless nationalism in Europe
Europe politics-related lists